Kanak Bira is a village in Odisha, India. It is located in the Bhatli block of Bargarh district.

Education
Only one high school in this village serves the whole Kelendapali Panchayat.

Panchayat High School, Kanak Bira 
Only unaided private high school, poorly aided teacher and infrastructure is not helping student around the area.

Upper Primary School
It is vernacular language school.

Economy
Agriculture is the major source. Some people engage in daily labourer for a living. Agriculture is not advancing due to lack of irrigation facility.

Health and sanitation
A Government-funded water supply system has existed since 2011. People still use traditional way of bathing at unhygienic pond. People still go for toilet outside filled and roadside.

Connectivity
Pradhan Mantri Gram sadak Yajna road is connected to nearest town Bhatli. Telecommunication service is advancing and internet user are increasing.

References

Villages in Bargarh district